Medal "For services in the education of military patriotism" (Azerbaijani: "Hərbi vətənpərvərlik tərbiyəsində xidmətlərə görə" medalı) is a state award of Azerbaijan. The award was established on February 13, 2018, in accordance with the law numbered 1001-VQD.

Description of the medal
The medal of the Republic of Azerbaijan "For services in military patriotic education" is awarded to servicemen, civil servants and other persons of the relevant executive authority for services in the organization of mobilization and conscription, military patriotic education and patriotic propaganda.

The way of wearing
The medal of the Azerbaijan Republic "For services in education of military patriotism" is put on the left side of a breast, after other orders and medals of the Azerbaijan Republic.

References

Further reading
 "Civil Service awards Report's employees", Report News Agency, 17 July 2021, retrieved and archived 2 January 2022.

Military awards and decorations of Azerbaijan
Awards established in 2018
2018 establishments in Azerbaijan